Hisham Atta Ajaj (born 1 January 1941) is a former Iraqi football forward who played for Iraq between 1964 and 1968. He played 12 matches and scored 6 goals. Atta was the top scorer of the 1964 Arab Nations Cup with 3 goals.

Career statistics

International goals
Scores and results list Iraq's goal tally first.

References

Iraqi footballers
Iraq international footballers
Association football forwards
Living people
1941 births